The JPL Small-Body Database (SBDB) is an astronomy database about small Solar System bodies. It is maintained by Jet Propulsion Laboratory (JPL) and NASA and provides data for all known asteroids and several comets, including orbital parameters and diagrams, physical diagrams, close approach details, radar astrometry, discovery circumstances, alternate designations and lists of publications related to the small body. The database is updated daily when new observations are available. In April 2021 the JPL Small-Body Database started using planetary ephemeris (DE441) and small-body perturber SB441-N16. Most objects such as asteroids get a two-body solution (Sun+object) recomputed twice a year. Comets generally have their two-body orbits computed at a time near the perihelion passage (closest approach to the Sun) as to have the two-body orbit more reasonably accurate for both before and after perihelion. For most asteroids, the epoch used to define an orbit is updated twice a year. Orbital uncertainties in the JPL Small-Body Database are listed at the 1-sigma level. 

On 27 September 2021 the JPL Solar System Dynamics website underwent a significant upgrade.

 orbits were computed in August 2021 and in the last 12 months more than 3.3 million orbits have been computed.

Close-approach data 
As of August 2013 (planetary ephemeris DE431) close-approach data is available for the major planets and the 16 most massive asteroids. Close approach data is available by adding &view=OPC to the query string at the end of the body's URL. Close approach data use to be available by adding ;cad=1 or &cad=1 to the query string. The Wayback Machine prefers the &cad=1 option. The JPL Small-Body Database close approach table lists a linearized uncertainty. The time of close approach uncertainty and min/max distance correspond to the 3-sigma level.

Orbit diagram 
A Java applet is available and provided as a 3D orbit visualization tool. The applet was implemented using unreliable 2-body methods, and hence should not be used for accurately determining the time of perihelion passage or planetary encounter circumstances. For accurate ephemerides use the JPL Horizons On-Line Ephemeris System that handles the n-body problem using numerical integration. The Java applet is available by adding &view=VOP to the query string at the end of the body's URL.

See also
 JPL Horizons On-Line Ephemeris System
 Jet Propulsion Laboratory Development Ephemeris
 NEODyS
 Sentry (monitoring system)

References

External links
 JPL Small-Body Database browser

Observational astronomy
Jet Propulsion Laboratory
Astronomical catalogues
JPL online services